The Office of Transition Initiatives (OTI) is part of the United States Agency for International Development (USAID) Bureau for Democracy, Conflict, and Humanitarian Assistance (DCHA) and was developed to provide fast, flexible, short-term assistance to take advantage of windows of opportunity to build democracy and peace. It seeks to lay the foundations for long-term development by promoting reconciliation, jump starting economies and helping stable democracy take hold.

History and mission
Lawrence Eagleburger, then outgoing Secretary of State under President George H. W. Bush, urged USAID in 1993 to find ways to move more quickly to address foreign policy priorities in order to stay relevant to national security decision-making. Incoming USAID Administrator J. Brian Atwood, three months after being confirmed, sent to Capitol Hill a proposal for a USAID Office of Crisis and Transition Management which Congress approved.

Since it was created 18 years ago, the USAID Office of Transition Initiatives has grown from a small experimental office managing $10 million in program funds in two countries to an office managing hundreds of millions of dollars in program funds in 11 to 14 countries a year. The stated mission of OTI is:

To support U.S. foreign policy objectives by helping local partners advance peace and democracy in priority countries in crisis. Seizing critical windows of opportunity, OTI works on the ground to provide fast, flexible, short-term assistance targeted at key political transition and stabilization needs.

Engagement criteria

 Is the country significant to U.S. national interests?
Transition assistance seeks primarily to advance U.S. foreign policy objectives and priorities unlike humanitarian aid which is distributed on the basis of need alone. Therefore OTI seeks to focus its resources where they will have the greatest impact on U.S. diplomatic and security interests.

 Is there a window of opportunity
OTI cannot create a transition or impose democracy, but it can identify and support key individuals and groups committed to peaceful, participatory reform. In short, OTI looks to be a catalyst for change where there is indigenous political will.

 Is OTI's involvement necessary for success?
OTI ensures that its program neither duplicate nor substitute for other U.S. government efforts, reserving its resources for those situation in which a unique contribution can be made. In addition, before engagement OTI explores whether local partners desire OTI assistance, whether OTI is the most appropriate U.S. government office to assist, and whether OTI's available resources and expertise are sufficient to achieve desired outcomes.

 Is the operating environment sufficiently stable?
The country must be stable enough to enable staff to travel outside of the capital to implement and monitor OTI-funded activities.

Partnerships
OTI's cultural approach is reflected in its partnerships with a variety of intra-agency and other U.S. Government stakeholders, local and international organizations, academic institutions and think tanks, nonprofit and private development firms, and military entities. OTI personnel share information and coordinate with colleagues from the fellow bureau offices including the Office of Foreign Disaster Assistance, Conflict Management and Mitigation, and Democracy, Human Rights and Governance, with Regional Bureaus, and with other USAID units.

Country Programs

Afghanistan
In July 2009, USAID's Office of Transition Initiatives (OTI) launched the first phase of its current program in Afghanistan to support the U.S. Government's stabilization and reconstruction initiatives. The objective of the Afghanistan Stabilization Initiative (ASI) was to address instability by fostering and strengthening conditions that build links between the Government of the Islamic Republic of Afghanistan (GIRoA) and local Afghan communities. In close coordination with the International Security Assistance Force (ISAF), the OTI program has increasingly supported communities in violence-prone areas where stabilization projects are needed most.

In March 2012, OTI began the second phase of its current engagement in Afghanistan. Through the Community Cohesion Initiative (CCI), OTI seeks to improve stability in areas vulnerable to insurgent exploitation in order to create an enabling environment for sustainable peace and traditional development programs by (1) strengthening ties between local actors, customary governance structures, and the GIRoA and (2) empowering community-based resiliencies to mitigate sources of instability.

Grounded in the principle that durable stability is a result of local will, empowerment, initiative, and leadership, OTI designs and implements clusters of small grants through a process-oriented, community-driven approach. In OTI programming, the project processes are as important as project outputs in contributing to the program's strategic goal of stabilization. OTI utilizes both "soft" (community-leadership shuras, District Governor outreach visits) and "hard" (small-scale infrastructure) activities to strengthen linkages between communities vulnerable to insurgent exploitation and positive GIRoA influencers. Community resiliencies are strengthened by improving their ability to resolve issues, promote viable economic activity, and communicate effectively within the community and with various government entities.

Côte d'Ivoire
Côte d'Ivoire faces serious political, social, and security challenges as it emerges from an outbreak of violence following the contested presidential election of November 28, 2010. This election was a part of the 2007 Ouagadougou Political Agreement, which outlined steps toward reunifying the country after its division into a government-controlled south and a rebel-controlled north. The accord sought to aid the process of ensuring Côte d'Ivoire's transition into a stable, prosperous, and democratically ruled country; instead, the situation deteriorated: 3,000 people lost their lives, hundreds of thousands were displaced, and an already tense social and political environment throughout the region was inflamed.

With the end of post-election violence and President Alassane Ouattara sworn into office, Côte d'Ivoire is in the midst of a full-scale political transition. The daunting challenge is to quickly secure peace and ensure all Ivoirians that representative and functional governance will replace 10 years of distrust.

To assist the new government during this window of opportunity, USAID's Office of Transition Initiatives (OTI) is beginning a program to support the process. The USAID/OTI program will seek to support the priorities of President Ouattara's administration in establishing a more equitable, responsive, and legitimate government. The program will work with the government and local groups to identify and respond to community-prioritized needs and encourage a peaceful transition as well as demonstrate the tangible benefits that come with a government responsive to the needs of its people.

Cuba
Between 2009 and 2012 the OTI secretly created and funded a Twitter-like service for Cubans called ZunZuneo, initially based on the mobile phone text message service and later with an internet interface. Contractors and front companies in the Cayman Islands, Spain and Ireland were used to provide the service. A longer term objective was to organize "smart mobs" that might "renegotiate the balance of power between the state and society." A database about the subscribers was created, including gender, age, and "political tendencies". At its peak ZunZuneo had 40,000 Cuban users, but the service closed as financially unsustainable when OTI funding was stopped. USAID, however, said that the system was not for political purposes and many parts of news articles about ZunZuneo, such as the smart mobs, were not accurate, and that it actually had close to 70,000 subscribers.

Haiti
USAID/OTI supports the USG Strategy in Haiti through cross-cutting work in the development corridors of Port-au-Prince, Saint Marc, and Cap Haitien. USAID/OTI lays the groundwork for future USG and other donor investments by increasing confidence in local leadership, building community collaboration and improving the relationship between citizens and government, improving perceptions of security, and facilitating access to economic opportunity.

In response to evolving needs, USAID/OTI's work in Haiti has been implemented in two phases:

Phase 1: Earthquake Relief and Recovery (January 2010 – July 2011)
 Large-scale cash-for-work projects 
 Rehabilitation of roads and other public infrastructure 
 Public information campaigns related to cholera outbreak and national elections 
 Technical assistance to Government of Haiti

Phase 2: Transitional Assistance (August 2011 – September 2013)
 Community engagement and strategic communications support for USG investments in Northern Haiti
 Livelihoods development and vocational training
 Restoration and improvement of public spaces
 Resettlement of earthquake-affected families
 Capacity building assistance to local and national government

Honduras
Central America has become the most violent region in the world outside of war zones, with the city of San Pedro Sula leading as the world's most violent city. Honduras currently has the world's highest murder rate and is a major transit point for the smuggling of arms, drugs, and people.

The Honduras program began in July 2012 and seeks to improve community security in targeted geographical and sectoral areas and increase citizen confidence in government institutions by strengthening alliances of citizens and government institutions in order to interrupt the patterns, systems, and perceptions that influence violent crime.

To achieve these objectives OTI is implementing small-scale, strategically targeted support to local partners and mutually identified activities that support the disruption of violence and enhanced citizen security efforts.

Kenya
USAID's Office of Transition Initiatives (OTI) launched its Kenya program in June 2008, four months after Kenya's competing political parties adopted a peace accord and power-sharing agreement to stem devastating interethnic violence that followed contested December 2007 national elections. The agreement opened a window of opportunity for OTI to support national and local-level stabilization and transition efforts targeted at recovery and reducing political and social volatility and vulnerability to violence. The two principal political parties are now faced with the challenge of moving Kenya forward.

In August 2009, OTI re-targeted its objectives to give greater focus to a two-pronged effort supporting the institutional and grassroots reforms outlined in the February 2008 National Accord, including a constitutional review, youth employment, police reform, and land reform. As a result, OTI seeks to support key U.S. Government policy goals and contribute to a stable Kenyan polity that mobilizes citizens' participation around a national identity and political party platforms rather than ethnic identities. In pursuit of this goal, the program assists Kenyan state and non-state actors to more fully exercise their capacities and, thereby, support the following broad objectives:

 Enable public institutions to undertake fundamental reforms and to manage instability and uncertainty; and
 Mobilize the public, especially the youth and key change agents, to demand accountability and reform.

Kyrgyzstan
In May 2010, USAID's Office of Transition Initiatives (OTI) launched a program in the Kyrgyz Republic in response to the country's political crises. Popular demonstrations in April led to the ouster of former President Kurmanbek Bakiyev. Given this window of opportunity, the U.S. Government was able to further demonstrate its support of democracy in Central Asia by supporting efforts aimed at establishing transparent, accountable, and effective governance at both national and local levels. The violence and mass displacements stemming from the June 2010 events in the southern part of the country highlighted the need for immediate and targeted assistance to address emerging sources of instability and conflict within communities that have the potential to derail the ongoing democratic transition. The constitutional referendum, followed by parliamentary, presidential, and local elections, represent critical milestones to establishing a more stable and secure democracy. During this critical period of transition, the USAID/OTI program in the Kyrgyz Republic is supporting the country's efforts by encouraging democratic processes and helping to build trust both within communities, and between citizens and government.

Libya
USAID's Office of Transition Initiatives (USAID/OTI) launched the Libya Transition Initiative (LTI) in June 2011 to support Libyan efforts to build an inclusive and accountable democratic government that reflects the will and needs of the Libyan people.
Specifically, USAID/OTI partners with civil society organizations, local media outlets, and interim governing authorities to support—

 Transitional political processes, particularly elections and constitutional development
Reconciliation, including transitional justice
Good governance, especially to improve strategic communications and public access to information.

In each of these areas, USAID/OTI has identified an urgent need to ensure the voices of everyday citizens, especially women and youth, are amplified so all Libyans can participate in the country's historic transition to democracy.

Lebanon
USAID's Office of Transition Initiatives (OTI) launched the Lebanon Civic Initiative in September 2007 to support U.S. foreign policy objectives aimed at promoting peace and stability in Lebanon. To continue supporting these policy objectives, OTI initiated the Lebanon Civic Support Initiative (LCSI) in January 2010. The program focuses on youth, who are often involved in conflict but also offer the best potential as proponents of peace and agents of change. Through small grants and short-term technical assistance, OTI works with a wide range of civil society partners to foster leadership and advocacy skills among youth, provide alternatives to political extremism, and create independent space for constructive civic activism.  LCSI has recently expanded programming in northern Lebanon, increasing the number of vocational trainings and community projects and events, and working in two areas that are seeing increasing tensions as a result of the spillover effects from the Syrian unrest.

Sri Lanka
OTI originally began a program addressing only the Eastern Province of Sri Lanka. The objectives of the program were to support community-focused reintegration and target at-risk youth and ex-combatants as part of an integrated strategy to stabilize, transform, and develop the Eastern Province. Following the military defeat of the Liberation Tigers of Tamil Eelam in the North, the program expanded to also support the Northern Province starting in 2009. The program seek to reach its objectives by:

 Strengthening institutional capabilities of, and supporting partnerships between, local government and communities, to improve service delivery and promote accountability and citizen participation
Encouraging livelihood opportunities for at-risk youth and ex-combatants, including vocational, information technology, and language training
Rehabilitating small-scale infrastructure projects related to economic recovery
Targeted cash-for-work projects to help recently resettled communities recover and jump start livelihoods

Tunisia 
After a month of youth-led protests fueled by socioeconomic pressures, corruption, and political repression, Tunisians toppled President Zine el-Abidine Ben Ali on January 14, 2011, ushering in a wave of political excitement and uncertainty. While initial steps have been taken toward building a more participatory democracy, a sense of marginalization is pervasive outside the capital Tunis. Despite continued efforts to make their views heard through existing political channels, citizens feel ignored by decision-makers, driving people to the streets to protest and demand change at a quicker pace.

In this window of opportunity, USAID's Office of Transition Initiatives (OTI) began a program to support Tunisia's transition process. Encouraged by a new sense of freedom, civil society organizations (CSOs) are forming and pushing their agendas forward. Non-governmental organizations are helping to shape the future at this crucial juncture in Tunisia's transition by documenting abuses, highlighting the role of youth in the Revolution, organizing civic education activities, and implementing modest local economic-development projects.

Pakistan
In November 2007, USAID's Office of Transition Initiatives (OTI) launched a program in Pakistan's Federally Administered Tribal Areas (FATA) that expanded in September 2009 into priority areas in Khyber-Pakhtunkhwa. The overall goal of the OTI program is to support conditions for stability and development in conflict-prone and other priority areas of Pakistan by—

building confidence and trust between the Government of Pakistan (GOP) and communities through the development and construction of community-identified projects
supporting good governance and encouraging broad-based community participation in decision making
increasing access to public information about GOP social, economic, and political activities and policies

The OTI program is an initial step in support of the GOP's renewed efforts to better deliver services to communities. The GOP is focusing efforts to bring security and development to FATA in particular, demonstrating a renewed commitment toward the region by enhancing the role of the FATA Secretariat (FS) and attracting investment to the area through the FATA Development Authority. To begin bringing sustained and coordinated development to the region, the FS has produced the FATA Sustainable Development Plan (SDP). The GOP has pledged $1 billion to the SDP and is actively soliciting additional funds from donor governments, including the United States.

To date, the program has implemented more than 1,600 projects worth $70 million in the region.

Venezuela
The OTI sought to destabilize the Hugo Chávez government by political interference and infiltration according to cables obtained by WikiLeaks. The strategy was initiated in 2006 under then Ambassador William Brownfield.

Notes

International development agencies
Civil affairs
United States Agency for International Development
Government agencies established in 1994
Organizations based in Washington, D.C.